The 2012 Pomeroy Inn & Suites National was held from January 25 to 29 at the EnCana Events Centre in Dawson Creek, British Columbia. It was the third Grand Slam event of the 2011–12 curling season and the eleventh time the tournament has been held. The purse was CAD$100,000.

In the final, Glenn Howard held off Kevin Martin to win the game with a score of 6–5 and clinch his second Grand Slam of the year, his third career Grand Slam at The National, and his tenth career Grand Slam overall.

CBC drops television coverage
Due to a dispute with iSport Media, the Slam management organization, the Canadian Broadcasting Corporation, which had been covering the Slams for four years, dropped their coverage of the 2012 National event at the last minute. It will make the first time since the 1962 Macdonald Brier that CBC will not be broadcasting curling.

Teams

Round-robin standings
Final round-robin standings

Round-robin results
All times listed in Pacific Standard Time (UTC-08).

Draw 1
Wednesday, January 25, 7:30 pm

Draw 2
Thursday, January 26, 9:00 am

Draw 3
Thursday, January 26, 12:30 pm

Draw 4
Thursday, January 26, 4:30 pm

Draw 5
Thursday, January 26, 8:00 pm

Draw 6
Friday, January 27, 8:00 am

Draw 7
Friday, January 27, 11:30 am

Draw 8
Friday, January 27, 3:00 pm

Draw 9
Friday, January 27, 8:00 pm

Tiebreaker
Saturday, January 28, 8:30 am

Playoffs

Quarterfinals
Saturday, January 28, 12:00 pm

Semifinals
Saturday, January 28, 6:00 pm

Final
Sunday, January 29, 11:00 am

References

External links
Event Home Page

National
Dawson Creek
The National (curling)
National
Curling in British Columbia
National